The Bonamico is an Italian river in whose source is near Montalto in the Aspromonte National Park. From there, the river flows east past San Luca and into the Ionian Sea south of Bovalino.

See also
Lago Costantino

References

Drainage basins of the Ionian Sea
Rivers of the Province of Reggio Calabria
Rivers of Italy